Spark MicroGrants is a 501(c)(3) non-profit organization that enables communities to organize and make progress, primarily focused on East Africa.

History
Spark MicroGrants has worked to put families facing poverty as the driving seat of local change since July 2010.
Spark’s key innovation is the Facilitated Collective Action Process (FCAP), in which a series of curated village meetings are held paired with a seed grant. In these meetings, impoverished families in villages plan and launch initiatives that range from schools to farms.

On average, 64 women and men, young and old, work and take action together. Since 2010, Spark has enabled over 170 villages to drive change through the FCAP across five countries. FCAP achieved 91% project sustainability and 94% of villages continue the process, meeting and taking action. 

Today Spark curates the community of practices to elevate the FCAP and support networks around the globe to use and develop the FCAP for their contexts. Such as the Government of Rwanda on a national decentralization program, a legal empowerment network in West Africa and a progressive refugee integration strategy in Uganda.

Spark MicroGrants began its work in Rwanda in 2010. Today the Spark process is used across Rwanda, Uganda, Burundi, Ghana and the Democratic Republic of Congo.

Spark has been touted as the organization that will transform aid distributed to people and build a world with dignity.

Board of directors
 Sasha Fisher, Executive Director
 Andy Bryant, Executive Director of the Segal Family Foundation
 Allison Devore
 Tom Fry
 Jonathan Jackson, Chief Executive Officer of Dimagi
 Stacey Faella
 Sandra Wijnberg
 Kara Weiss

Media coverage
In 2011, Spark MicroGrants was featured in Forbes magazine and was a semi-finalist in the Buckminster Fuller Challenge.

Statistics
Spark MicroGrant's model has been used to support 160+ community partners across Rwanda, Uganda, Burundi, the Democratic Republic of the Congo and Ghana to launch local projects, with the support of foundations and private donors.

See also

 Social entrepreneurship
 Community mobilization
 Community organizing
 Local development
 Community-driven development
 Systems change

References

External links

Saving the World on a Shoestring: Spark MicroGrants, Forbes
Spark MicroGrants, Spotlight Projects, Segal Family Foundation

Organizations established in 2010
Charities based in New York (state)
Foreign charities operating in Rwanda
Microfinance in Africa
2010 establishments in New York (state)